This page shows the results of the triathlon competition at the 2002 Central American and Caribbean Games, held on November 28, 2002, in San Salvador, El Salvador. For the second time the sport was a part of the multi-sports event.

Men's individual competition

Women's competition

See also
Triathlon at the 2002 South American Games
Triathlon at the 2003 Pan American Games

References
Results

2002 Central American and Caribbean Games
Central American and Caribbean Games
2002